Claudin 4, also known as CLDN4, is a protein which in humans is encoded by the CLDN4 gene. It belongs to the group of claudins.

This gene encodes an integral membrane protein, which belongs to the claudin family. The protein is a component of tight junction strands and may play a role in internal organ development and function during pre- and postnatal life. This gene is deleted in Williams-Beuren syndrome, a neurodevelopmental disorder affecting multiple systems.

Claudin 4 can also be used as a marker for distinguishing malignant mesothelioma from lung cancer and uterine serous carcinoma. As a pancreatic cancer marker in cell-blocks of effusion specimens, it has also been found to have a superior performance to BerEp4 staining.

References

External links

Further reading